In theoretical physics, a cascading gauge theory is a gauge theory whose coupling rapidly changes with the scale in such a way that Seiberg duality must be applied many times. 
Igor Klebanov and Matthew Strassler studied this kind of N=1 gauge theory in the context of the AdS-CFT correspondence, which is dual to  the warped deformed conifold.

External links
 hep-th/0007191 "Supergravity and a Confining Gauge Theory: Duality Cascades and Chiral Symmetry Breaking-Resolution of Naked Singularities" High Energy Physics - Theory (hep-th); Igor R. Klebanov (Princeton), Matthew J. Strassler (IAS) 24 Jul 2000

Gauge theories